That Forward Center Died at Dawn is a 1961 Argentine drama film, adapted by Agustín Cuzzani from his play of the same name. It was directed by René Mugica and was entered into the 1961 Cannes Film Festival.

Plot
"Cacho" Garibaldi (Luis Medina Castro), skillful soccer player is bought by a millionaire named Lupus (Raul Rossi) and a stormy night was moved to the mansion of Lupus, a combination of palace, fortress and prison. There he learns that Garibaldi Cacho Lupus is a collector of exceptional human beings, who knows Cacho at the time, and that the player may never play again or leave.

Cacho falls in love with another prisoner, a dancer, and they try to escape; Cacho misses and kills Lupus and ending shot by the guards.

Cast
 Arturo Arcari
 Didi Carli
 Camilo Da Passano
 Pierina Dealessi
 Francisco Pablo Donadio
 Enrique Fava
 Félix Daniel Frascara
 Lalo Hartich
 Roberto Maidana
 Víctor Martucci
 Luis Medina Castro
 Javier Portales
 Raúl Rossi
 Eduardo Vargas

References

External links

1961 films
1960s Spanish-language films
1961 drama films
Argentine black-and-white films
Films directed by René Múgica
Argentine drama films
1960s Argentine films